Square Mile is a men's luxury lifestyle magazine distributed to those working in the City of London's financial industry.

History and profile
The first issue of Square Mile was published in July 2005. The magazine is published by Square Up Media in London, which was founded by Tim Slee and Stephen Murphy. The magazine is edited by Mark Hedley, who also oversees content for the Square Up Group. Hedley won Editor of the Year 2014 at the PPA Independent Publisher Awards, and was shortlisted at the BSME Editor of the Year 2015.

References

External links
 Squaremile.com

Business magazines published in the United Kingdom
Lifestyle magazines published in the United Kingdom
Monthly magazines published in the United Kingdom
Magazines published in London
Magazines established in 2005